Max Institute of Cancer Care Lajpat Nagar is a healthcare facility situated in New Delhi, India.

Services 
The hospital has Breast Clinic, Colposcopy and Gynaecological Cancer Screening Clinic, Antenatal (Pregnancy) and Endocrine disorder Clinic, IVF Clinic. The hospital has NABL approved labs, certified radiologists and a DOT treatment centre among other medical services.

It provides preventive, curative and consultancy services pertaining to areas including Dental Care, Eye Care, Oncology, Neurology, Internal Medicine, Paediatric, Medical and Surgical Gastroenterology, Pulmonology, Orthopaedics, Urology/Andrology, Physiotherapy, Endocrinology Endocrine Surgery, Cardiac Surgery (CTVS), • Dermatology, Nutrition, In-vitro fertilization and trauma.

Campus and location 
The facility is situated in Lajpat Nagar, New Delhi. It is the Authorized Panel Site for Immigration Check for countries including Australia, Canada, US, (UK) and New Zealand.

Associated services 
The hospital provides various amenities to patients and visitors including a blood bank, 24-hr chemist, translators, cafeteria, waiting lounge, prayer room, bank/ATM, valet parking, business associates, TPAs and alliance partners.
People have claimed that the centre overcharges for the people coming for medical check-up related to immigration and visa services as several people have been asked to go for medical tests again and again just to extort money from them.

References 

Hospitals in Delhi
Year of establishment missing